is a charter airline based in Narita International Airport in Narita, Chiba in Japan. It operates scheduled services under the ANA brand. It was announced on 2 April 2010 that Air Japan and ANA & JP Express will merge, with Air Japan being the surviving company.  Air Japan shares the same callsign with All Nippon Airways on all flights except routes to and from Seoul Incheon, Hong Kong, Taipei, and Honolulu which use the Air Japan call sign.

History 
Air Japan was established as World Air Network on 29 June 1990 and became the charter airline arm of ANA, but ceased operation since September 1995. In 2000, World Air Network was renamed Air Japan and relaunched service in 2001, the first flight departed from Osaka to Seoul, South Korea.

On 9 March 2023, ANA announced that Air Japan will operate as a low-cost medium-haul carrier servicing flights to and from Southeast Asia starting in February 2024, using the Boeing 787 Dreamliner as its aircraft.

Corporate affairs 
The airline has its headquarters at the  3B, Narita International Airport in Narita, Chiba.

In addition to its headquarters, Air Japan also used to have offices at Shiodome City Center in Minato, Tokyo.

Destinations 

Air Japan passenger flights serve the following destinations (as of March 2018):

All passenger routes are code-shared with All Nippon Airways and wear ANA livery.

Fleet 
The Air Japan fleet consists of aircraft from the ANA mainline fleet. These aircraft are all operated by both ANA and Air Japan pilots.

References

Air Japan Company Information (in Japanese)
ANA's press release of the Air Japan launch

External links

 

Airlines of Japan
Charter airlines
All Nippon Airways
Airlines established in 1990
Japanese companies established in 1990
Companies based in Chiba Prefecture
Narita, Chiba
Star Alliance affiliate members